Nokia C3 may refer to: 
Nokia C3-00, a 2010 feature phone with a QWERTY keyboard
Nokia C3 Touch and Type or C3-01, a 2010 feature phone
Nokia C3 (2020), an Android smartphone released in 2020